Overbrook is a neighborhood on Pittsburgh, Pennsylvania's South Hills area.  It has zip codes of 15227, 15234 and 15210 and has representation on Pittsburgh City Council by the council member for District 4 (South Neighborhoods). Originally called Fairhaven, the name was changed to Overbrook when breaking away from Baldwin Township to become a borough. Overbrook is located at the edge of the city, south of Downtown, and is surrounded by the city neighborhoods Brookline and Carrick and the boroughs of Castle Shannon and Whitehall. Overbrook Borough was one of the last annexed into the City of Pittsburgh. The historic Overbrook Community Center retains its borough origins and is still used by the community. 

Overbrook is convenient to both Phillips and Brookline Parks, as well the Brownsville Road and Brookline Boulevard business districts. It is an easy trip on the South Busway to Downtown, Station Square, and Century III and South Hills Village malls with a light rail and busway stations. 

Overbrook has experienced an influx of young families with children in recent years. The Overbrook Center and ballfield provide recreation for youth.

Surrounding neighborhoods
Overbrook has five borders, including the Pittsburgh neighborhoods of Brookline to the northwest and Carrick to the northeast, the boroughs of Whitehall to the south and Castle Shannon to the south-southwest, and the township of Baldwin to the southwest.

References

External links
Interactive Pittsburgh Neighborhoods Map
Pittsburgh City Council - District 4
Carrick-Overbrook Historical Society

List of Pittsburgh neighborhoods
Carrick-Overbrook Historical Society

See also

 
Neighborhoods in Pittsburgh
South Hills History